Herman Wasswa (born 14 December 1993) is a Ugandan football midfielder who plays for Police FC.

References

1993 births
Living people
Ugandan footballers
Uganda international footballers
Masaka Local Council FC players
SC Villa players
Kampala Capital City Authority FC players
Sofapaka F.C. players
Express FC players
Lusaka Dynamos F.C. players
Uganda Revenue Authority SC players
Maroons FC players
Police FC (Uganda) players
Association football midfielders
Ugandan expatriate footballers
Expatriate footballers in Kenya
Ugandan expatriate sportspeople in Kenya
Expatriate footballers in Zambia
Ugandan expatriate sportspeople in Zambia
People from Masaka District